Rohit Sharma (born 1983) is an Indian cricketer who plays for Rajasthan.

References

1983 births
Living people
Indian cricketers
Place of birth missing (living people)